The 2011–12 Liechtenstein Cup was the sixty-seventh season of Liechtenstein's annual cup competition. Seven clubs competed with a total of sixteen teams for one spot in the first qualifying round of the 2012–13 UEFA Europa League. Defending champions were Vaduz, who have won the cup continuously since 1998 and won their 40th Liechtenstein Cup last season. USV Eschen/Mauren won the cup, beating FC Vaduz on penalties in the final, becoming the first team other than FC Vaduz to win the cup since 1997 (and also the last as of 2022).

First round
The First Round featured eight teams. In this round entered seven of the reserve clubs participating in the competition, along with FC Triesen. These matches took place on 16 and 17 August 2011.

|colspan="3" style="background-color:#99CCCC; text-align:center;"|16 August 2011

|-
|colspan="3" style="background-color:#99CCCC; text-align:center;"|17 August 2011

|}

Second round
The four winners of the First Round, along with FC Schaan, FC Ruggell, FC Schaan Azzurri and FC Balzers II competed in the Second Round. The games were played on 14 September 2011.

|colspan="3" style="background-color:#99CCCC; text-align:center;"|14 September 2011

|}

Quarterfinals
The four winners of the Second Round entered the Quarterfinals, along with the semifinalists from last season's competitions: FC Vaduz, USV Eschen/Mauren, FC Balzers and FC Triesenberg.

|colspan="3" style="background-color:#99CCCC; text-align:center;"|18 October 2011

|-
|colspan="3" style="background-color:#99CCCC; text-align:center;"|25 October 2011

|-
|colspan="3" style="background-color:#99CCCC; text-align:center;"|26 October 2011

|-
|colspan="3" style="background-color:#99CCCC; text-align:center;"|2 November 2011

|}

Semifinals
The four winners of the Quarterfinals will compete in the Semifinals.

|colspan="3" style="background-color:#99CCCC; text-align:center;"|9 April 2012

|-
|colspan="3" style="background-color:#99CCCC; text-align:center;"|10 April 2012

|-
|}

Final
The final was played in the national stadium, Rheinpark Stadion.

References

External links
 Official site 
 RSSSF

Liechtenstein Football Cup seasons
Liechtenstein Cup
2011–12 in Liechtenstein football